O Gênio do Crime (The Genius of Crime)  is a 1969 novel, the first book by Brazilian author João Carlos Marinho. It remains a publishing success, with more than 1 million copies sold in 62 editions, and is cited as one of the great novels of Brazilian children's literature. It is a severe social critique of Brazilian society.

In 2006 it was published in Spanish under the title El Crimen del Genius. It was adapted for film in 1973 by Tito Teijido, entitled O Detetive Bolacha contra o Gênio do Crime.

References

1969 Brazilian novels
1969 children's books
Brazilian children's books
Portuguese-language novels
Children's mystery novels